Kyle James Hauser is a songwriter, multi-instrumentalist and singer. He was born in Alexandria, Virginia on March 14, 1985.

Musical career

Kyle James is a graduate of the Berklee College of Music with a degree in Songwriting and performs what American Songwriter described as, "neo-folk" on banjo, guitar and voice.

Hauser began performing his original songs in 2011 and that year was a finalist at the Telluride Bluegrass Festival's troubadour contest as well as The Rocky Mountain Folk Festival and made showcase performances at CMJ and The Toronto International Film Festival.

In January, 2012 he released his debut album "Oh Oh" on sonaBLAST! Records with a lineup including cellist Ben Sollee, guitarist Grant Gordy (David Grisman Quintet), producer Jayme Stone, and Grammy winning mastering engineer David Glasser. Songs from "Oh, Oh" have been featured on MTV's series 16 & Pregnant and Teen Mom and in the feature films The Big Sick, Beauty Mark, Where Hope Grows, Creditors, YERT,  2nd Serve, and A Strange Brand of Happy among others. Hauser has since toured extensively, including a showcase at SXSW and opening performances for Brett Dennen, Leo Kottke, John Hiatt, Bonnie "Prince" Billy, The Head and the Heart, Mayer Hawthorne, Nathaniel Rateliff, Tennis (band), David Grisman, Sam Bush, Jake Shimabukuro, Thao & the Get Down Stay Down and Gregory Alan Isakov.

Hauser release his follow up album, "You A Thousand Times" in 2014. It reached the #1 position on Colorado Public Radio in March of that year. Following this he joined Colorado based band, "Rapidgrass" releasing two albums in 2014 and 2015 and touring internationally, notably headlining the La Roche Bluegrass Festival in France summer of 2016. In the fall of 2015 Hauser co-wrote a ballet with the Louisville Ballet.

Hauser currently serves as Artist Development Manager at the groundbreaking incubator, The Music District, in Fort Collins, CO. He also teaches songwriting at the Berklee College Of Music's online school.

Discography

 You a Thousand Times (sonaBLAST! Records, 2014)
 Belle 100 Steamboat Songs (sonaBLAST! Records, 2014)
 Oh Oh (sonaBLAST! Records, 2012)

Also Appears on

Run With You - Thunder and Rain (producer, 2016)
Crooked Road - Rapidgrass Quintet (banjo/voice/songwriting, 2015)
Self Titled - Rapidgrass Quintet (banjo/voice, 2014)
Self Titled - Lee Ave (producer/guitar/voice, 2012)
Live for Today - The Drunken Hearts (banjo, 2012)
Lexicon - Will Knox (banjo, 2012)
Misfit - Rob Roper (banjo, 2011)
The Matador and the Acrobat - Will Knox (banjo, 2010)
Self Titled - Head for the Hills (banjo, 2010)
Unpredictable - John McVey (banjo, 2010)
Hearts, Words and Other Forgotten Things - Ayo Awosika (banjo, 2009)
Big Fiddle - Liz Davis Maxfield (banjo, 2009)
Another City - Brooke Parrott (banjo, 2008)
Buckled Knees - Will Knox (banjo, 2007)
Self Titled - Caitlin Nicol-Thomas (banjo, 2007)
Last Call Poets - Audible Audities (banjo, 2007)
Self Titled - Johnny Vs The Ninjas (guitar/vocals, 2006)

Music in Film and TV

Television

16 and Pregnant (MTV, 2012)
Teen Mom (MTV, 2012)

Film
 The Big Sick (Apatow Productions, 2017)
 Beauty Mark (The Group Entertainment, 2017)
Lazy Eye (T42 Entertainment, 2016)
Split (Derby City Productions, 2016)
Where Hope Grows (Lionsgate Entertainment, 2015, Sony Pictures, 2016)
End Of The Line (Wilder Productions, 2015)
Creditors (Tough Dance Productions, 2015)
A Strange Brand of Happy (Rebel Pilgrim Productions, 2013)
2nd Serve (The Group Entertainment, 2013)
YERT (Media Changing Media, 2012)

References

1985 births
Living people
American male singer-songwriters
American folk singers
Berklee College of Music alumni
Musicians from Alexandria, Virginia
Singer-songwriters from Virginia
21st-century American singers
21st-century American male singers